Jianshe or Pelyul is a town and seat of Baiyü County, Garzê Tibetan Autonomous Prefecture, in the west of Sichuan Province in Southwest China.

Baiyü County
Towns in Sichuan